Wansuqucha (Quechua qucha lake,  Hispanicized spellings Huanzoccocha, Huanzococha, also Wansuqocha) is a lake in Peru located in the Arequipa Region, La Unión Province, Huaynacotas District.

References 

Lakes of Peru
Lakes of Arequipa Region